Arteris, Inc. is a multinational technology firm that develops the on-chip interconnect fabric technology and IP-XACT-based IP deployment technology used to create System-on-Chip (SoC) semiconductor designs for a variety of devices, particularly in automotive electronics, artificial intelligence/machine learning and consumer markets. The company specializes in the development and distribution of Network-on-Chip (NoC) interconnect Intellectual Property (IP) and IP deployment technology used in the development of systems-on-chip.  It is best known for its flagship product, Arteris FlexNoC, which by 2013 was used in more than 60 percent of mobile and wireless SoC designs. The company offers a cache coherent interconnect IP product line called Ncore as well as a last level cache called CodaCache. As a result of its acquisition of Magillem Design Services, the company also offers a suite of IP deployment products primarily based on the IEEE 1685 IP-XACT standard.

Arteris, Inc. is headquartered in Campbell, California. K. Charles Janac is the company’s President and CEO.

In 2012, the Silicon Valley San Jose Business Journal ranked Arteris as the 4th fastest-growing private company in Silicon Valley. Arteris was also on the Inc. 500 list of America’s fastest growing companies for two years running.

History

Arteris was founded in 2003 by Philippe Boucard and two other engineering executives who had worked together at T.Sqware, a startup that was acquired by Globespan. Company executives wished to address problems with existing monolithic bus and crossbar interconnect technologies, such as wire and routing congestion, increased heat and power consumption, failed timing closure, and increased die area. The firm’s leadership sought and received venture capital totaling $44.1 million for the creation of its new technology from investors, including ARM Holdings, Crescendo Ventures, DoCoMo Capital, Qualcomm, Synopsys, TVM Capital, and Ventech.

By 2006, Arteris developed the first commercially available NoC IP product, called NoC Solution, followed in 2009 by a more advanced product, FlexNoC. The products used “packetization and a distributed network of small interconnect elements to address congestion, timing, power and performance issues.” Arteris marketed FlexNoC as an improvement on traditional SoCs interconnect fabrics, citing its reduction in gate count by 30 percent, reduction of wires by 50 percent, and a more compact chip floor as compared to a functionally equivalent hybrid bus or crossbar.

Designers of SoCs began to take advantage of the technology’s increased design efficiency, flexibility, and a significant reduction in production costs. By 2012, the company had over 40 semiconductor customers, including Qualcomm, Samsung, Texas Instruments, Toshiba, and LG Electronics, with 200 million SoCs being produced with Arteris IP. The company’s volume is projected to grow to over 1 billion units per year by 2015.

In October 2013, Qualcomm Technologies, Inc. acquired the FlexNoC network-on-chip product portfolio, but Arteris retained existing customer contracts and to continue licensing FlexNoC and modifying the source code for customer support. Qualcomm will provide engineering deliverables for the FlexNoC product line and updates to Arteris. Qualcomm does not maintain any ownership interest in Arteris.

In September 2014, Arteris launched the Arteris FlexNoC Resilience Package, which added functional safety mechanisms to the FlexNoC interconnect IP useful for ISO 26262 and IEC 61508 standards compliance.

In May 2016, Arteris released its first version of the Ncore Cache Coherent Interconnect IP product with optional support for functional safety.

In 2020, Arteris acquired Magillem Design Services, adding a suite of IP-XACT-based products for automating the creation of systems-on-chip and their associated software and firmware, verification and simulation platforms, and specifications and customer documentation.

Licensees
Arteris claims to have had 200 licensees of its products since its inception in 2003 with over 500 chip designs created with its IP products.

These licensees include top-20 semiconductor makers Samsung Electronics, NXP, Toshiba, Texas Instruments, STMicroelectronics, Renesas Electronics, and multiple divisions of Intel composed of acquired companies Mobileye, Altera, and Movidius.

Arteris has also signed many licensees creating electronics for autonomous vehicles and electric vehicles. Arteris IP is in multiple generations of Intel Mobileye's EyeQ series of Advanced Driver-Assistance Systems (ADAS) as well as automotive systems from Bosch, NXP, STMicroelectronics and many others.
 
Other publicly announced licensees of Arteris products include Baidu, SK Telecom, Canaan Creative, Bitmain, Aeva, Hailo, Black Sesame Technologies, Kyocera, Displaylink, and OpenFive/SiFive (formerly Open-Silicon).

Products

Arteris offers system-on-chip system IP consisting of semiconductor intellectual property (IP) and IP-XACT-based IP deployment technologies for the creation of systems-on-chip.

Semiconductor IP
IP products based on Network-on-chip technology include:
FlexNoC Interconnect IP
Ncore Cache Coherent Interconnect IP
CodaCache Last Level Cache IP
Optional packages for the above products include:
Ncore Resilience Package - for functional safety capabilities
FlexNoC Resilience Package
FlexNoC AI Package

IP Deployment
Database and data analytics products based on the IEEE 1685 IP-XACT standard include:
SoC and Hardware/Software Interface (HSI) Development Suite, which automatically applies metadata to chip IP blocks to enable automation of the SoC development, EDA, and software development processes
Design Data Intelligence Suite, which uses semantic computing to create links between disparate systems and data used in the SoC design and EDA flows for traceability and search
Product Information Management Suite, which automatically generates engineering specifications and user documentation

External links

References

Technology companies established in 2003
Semiconductor companies of the United States
2003 establishments in California
2021 initial public offerings
Companies listed on the Nasdaq